The Canary hotspot, also called the Canarian hotspot, is a hotspot and volcanically active region centred on the Canary Islands located off the north-western coast of Africa. Hypotheses for this volcanic activity include lithosphere extension permitting melt to rise from the mantle beneath (the plate hypothesis), and a deep mantle plume. Volcanism is believed to have first started about 70 million years ago.

Recent activity 
 
From July to September 2011, the Canarian island of El Hierro experienced thousands of small tremors, believed to be the result of magma movements beneath the island. This resulted in fears of an imminent volcanic eruption, which began October 10, 2011, approximately 1 km south of the island in a fissure on the floor of the ocean. Eruptions continued until March 2012.

See also
2021 Cumbre Vieja volcanic eruption
2011–12 El Hierro eruption
Geology of the Canary Islands

References

Hotspots of the Atlantic Ocean
Volcanism of the Canary Islands